Grantray-Lawrence Animation was an animation studio active from 1954 to 1968 and founded by Grant Simmons, Ray Patterson (hence "Grant-Ray"), and Robert L. Lawrence.

This animation company produced commercials and low-budget animated television shows until it went bankrupt in 1968 and its distributor, Krantz Films, took over production. The best-known of those animated shows are its adaptations of superheroes from Marvel Comics, the earliest such adaptations for electronic media. Before then, it did sub-contracted work on Top Cat, The Jetsons, The Dick Tracy Show, and The Famous Adventures of Mr. Magoo.

Filmography

References

External links
 The Big Cartoon DataBase entry for Grantray-Lawrence Animation

American animation studios
Mass media companies established in 1954
Mass media companies disestablished in 1967